Wang Ping may refer to the following people surnamed Wang: 
Wang Ping (Three Kingdoms) (died 248), official during the Han dynasty and Shu of the Three Kingdoms period
Wang Ping (filmmaker) (1916–1990), Chinese filmmaker and actress
Wang Ping (Taiwanese actress) (born 1950), Taiwanese actress
Wang Ping (author) (born 1957), Chinese-American author and academic

See also
Wangping (disambiguation), a list of places
Ping Wang (disambiguation)